Puerto Octay is a town and commune in Osorno Province located on the north shore of Llanquihue Lake in Los Lagos Region in the south of Chile. It was settled by German colonists in 1852. Puerto Octay was an important port with regular traffic to Puerto Varas before the railway opened in 1912.

History
Its origin dates back to the German colonization in 1852 driven by Bernhard Philippi. Years later it became one of the major ports on Lake Llanquihue. On 22 December 1891 the municipality was established, under the Presidency of the Republic Jorge Montt.

German heritage history

Puerto Octay currently has a rich and varied architecture, mostly built of wood, which is the historical reflection of the colonization process, driven by the State of Chile in the mid-nineteenth century, with families coming from Germany.

Some prominent buildings are the House Niklitschek, Hotel Haase, Wulf House, the current Colegio San Vicente de Paul and Werner House. What is extraordinary about this city is that despite the lapse of more than 100 years, it is still possible to assess this type of buildings.

In order to preserve this architectural heritage, Puerto Octay is currently in the process of being declared a Typical Zone. This will identify a representative area of identity and history, which will be legally protected by the State of Chile.

Flora and fauna

Birds: thrush, dove, parrot, rooster from the mountain (extinct), kestrel, heron, sparrows, swallows.

Mammals: cougar, nutria, among others.

Fish: salmon native (locally extinct), mackerel, trout.

Tourism

Referring to tourism in the district lake, Lake Llanquihue has beautiful beaches for vacations, fishing and water sports. The most notable include Rupanco Islet, La Baja, Puerto Maitén and Fonck.

Demographics
Of these, 3,403 (33.2%) lived in urban areas and 6,833 (66.8%) in rural areas. The population fell by 7.4% (815 persons) between the 1992 and 2002 censuses.

Administration
As a commune, Puerto Octay is a third-level administrative division of Chile administered by a municipal council, headed by an alcalde who is directly elected every four years.

Within the electoral divisions of Chile, Puerto Octay is represented in the Chamber of Deputies by Fidel Espinoza (PS) and Carlos Recondo (UDI) as part of the 56th electoral district, together with Puyehue, Río Negro, Purranque, Fresia, Frutillar, Llanquihue, Puerto Varas and Los Muermos. The commune is represented in the Senate by Camilo Escalona Medina (PS) and Carlos Kuschel Silva (RN) as part of the 17th senatorial constituency (Los Lagos Region).

References

External links
  Municipality of Puerto Octay
Hotel Haase
Municipality of Puerto Octay
Municipal Public Library Puerto Octay
LagoLlanquihue.com Information Portal of the communities of the Lake
Page of Puerto Octay

Llanquihue Province
Communes of Chile
Populated lakeshore places in Chile
Populated places established in 1891
Populated places in Osorno Province
1891 establishments in Chile